Cnemidophorus nigricolor is a species of teiid lizard endemic to Venezuela.

References

nigricolor
Reptiles of Venezuela
Endemic fauna of Venezuela
Reptiles described in 1873
Taxa named by Wilhelm Peters